Botocudo is a genus of dirt-colored seed bugs in the family Rhyparochromidae. There are at least 30 described species in Botocudo.

Species
These 36 species belong to the genus Botocudo:

 Botocudo aethiops (Distant, W.L., 1904) c g
 Botocudo ashanti Southwood, 1963 c g
 Botocudo assimulans (Bergroth, E., 1918) c g
 Botocudo cavernicola Slater, J.A., 1984 c g
 Botocudo delineatus (Distant, 1893) i c g
 Botocudo diluticornis (Stål, 1858) i c g
 Botocudo ferrugineus Linnavuori, R., 1978 c g
 Botocudo flavicornis (Signoret, V., 1880) c g
 Botocudo formosanus (Hidaka, T., 1959) c g
 Botocudo fraternus (Distant, W.L., 1918) c g
 Botocudo gardineri (Distant, W.L., 1913) c g
 Botocudo giloensis Linnavuori, R., 1978 c g
 Botocudo hebrodes Slater, J.A. & Polhemus, 1987 c g
 Botocudo hirsutus Zheng, L.Y. & H.G. Zou, 1981 c g
 Botocudo japonicus (Hidaka, T., 1959) c g
 Botocudo longicornis (Barber, H.G., 1958) c g
 Botocudo marginatus Zheng, L.Y. & H.G. Zou, 1981 c g
 Botocudo marianensis (Usinger, 1946) i c g
 Botocudo modestus (Barber, 1948) i c g b
 Botocudo neomodesta Slater, J.A. & H. Brailovsky, 1994 c g
 Botocudo noualhieri (Bergroth, E., 1895) c g
 Botocudo ornatulus (Bergroth, E., 1895) c g
 Botocudo patricius Distant, W.L., 1904 c g
 Botocudo picticollis (Bergroth, E., 1895) c g
 Botocudo picturatus (Distant, W.L., 1893) c g
 Botocudo polhemusi Slater, J.A. & Polhemus, 1987 c g
 Botocudo pronotalis Slater, J.A., 1979 c g
 Botocudo pusio (Stal, C., 1858) c g
 Botocudo rennellensis (Scudder, G.G.E., 1958) c g
 Botocudo scudderi Slater, J.A., 1979 c g
 Botocudo signanda (Distant, W.L., 1903) c g
 Botocudo swezeyi (China, W.E., 1930) c g
 Botocudo validulus (Bergroth, E., 1918) c g
 Botocudo vitticollis Linnavuori, R., 1978 c g
 Botocudo x-niger Linnavuori, R., 1978 c g
 Botocudo yasumatsui (Hidaka, T., 1959) c g

Data sources: i = ITIS, c = Catalogue of Life, g = GBIF, b = Bugguide.net

References

Rhyparochromidae
Articles created by Qbugbot